Stage Fright is a 1997 stop-motion short film produced, directed, and written by Steve Box. The story follows Tiny, a music hall (vaudeville) performer, Arnold Hugh, a silent film actor, and Tiny's co-worker Daphne, as they attempt to adjust to the coming age of film. Tiny, Arnold, and the Organist are voiced by Graham Fellows, whereas Daphne is voiced by Tess Daulton. The short film is eleven minutes in length, and won a BAFTA Award for Best Animated Short Film in 1998.

Plot 
Tiny, a dog trainer, hides with his dogs in a wicker basket on the stage of an abandoned vaudeville theater. He emerges to have them practice a trick, attacking a tattered straw boater hat on command. When a second man, Arnold Hugh, emerges menacingly onto the stage, Tiny fearfully backs away from him and falls into the orchestra pit, getting his clothes snagged on a broken plank.

Years earlier, Tiny had found one of his dogs missing while performing his trained-dog act in the theater. Even though he fears that the crowd no longer likes the act, his friend Daphne encourages him to go on with the show. He is booed off the stage in favor of a silent movie, which stars Arnold and Daphne and features the missing dog, taken by Daphne. Arnold pressures her not to tell Tiny about the theft and goes on to make a string of successful movies with Daphne and the dogs.

Tiny trains the dogs to jump up and place a boater on his head at his command. When Arnold uses this trick in one of his movies, though, it fails because he is taller than Tiny; he angrily confronts Tiny and threatens to torture the animals unless they can reach his height. Angered, Tiny re-trains them to attack instead, prompting Arnold to leave the studio for the confrontation seen at the beginning of the film. Daphne decides that she no longer wants to work with Arnold and follows him to the theater.

Daphne swings a sandbag across the stage, knocking Arnold down, and confesses her involvement to Tiny. Arnold gets up and begins to strangle Daphne, but Tiny delivers his attack command and the dogs advance menacingly toward him. Arnold pulls a metal latch off the wall to use as a weapon, triggering the movie screen to come down on his head and kill him.

Daphne sees no sign of Tiny when she turns back to the orchestra pit, but he is lifted into view on the organ that had been used to provide background music for Arnold's movies. It now glows white, being played by a spectral organist; Tiny climbs off, unhurt, but Arnold's spirit rises from his body and steps on at the organist's beckoning. The organ then swiftly drops out of sight, carrying a terrified Arnold down to the Underworld. As the theater begins to collapse, Daphne persuades Tiny to overcome his fear of rejection and leave with her. They and the dogs exit into the light of the outside world.

Trivia
When the movie screen comes down on Arnold Hugh's head and kills him, he kicks a bucket that was standing in front of him on the stage ("kick the bucket" meaning to die.) This gag was inspired from a clip from It's a Mad, Mad, Mad, Mad World where Jimmy Durante's character, Smiler Grogan dies and literally kicks a bucket.

This short is often and almost consider one of Aardman Animations' darkest works, despite the short being incredibly obscure.

The Organist that appears at the beginning of the short and later near the end, show his spectral self and beckons Arnold Hugh's ghost to the underworld, bears a strong resemblance to Oogie Boogie from Tim Burton's 1993 Stop-motion film, The Nightmare Before Christmas, which had been released merely four years prior. 

If any were to listen closely, classic stock sound effects can be heard at several points throughout the short.

Reception

Awards
Stage Fright won a 1998 BAFTA Award for Best Short Animated Film. It was also nominated for Crystal Star for Best European Short at the 1998 Brussels International Film Festival, for the Jury Award at the 1998 Palm Springs International Festival of Short Films, as well as the Best Animated Film Award at the 1998 Molodist International Film Festival.

References

External links
 

British short films
Films set in the 1920s
1997 animated films
1997 films
1990s stop-motion animated films
Stop-motion animated short films
1990s English-language films